Cyril Suresh Shroff (born 1959) is an Indian corporate lawyer. He is the managing partner of Cyril Amarchand Mangaldas (CAM), India's largest full services law firm, since May 2015, and previously was the managing partner of Amarchand & Mangaldas & Suresh A Shroff & Co, since 1995. He was awarded ‘Deal Maker of the Year’ in 2020 & ‘Managing Partner of the Year’ in 2019 and 2022 by Asian Legal Business (ALB) India Law Awards.

Education
Shroff was admitted to the Bar in 1982 after receiving his BA, LLB degree from the Government Law College, Mumbai. He is a solicitor, High Court of Bombay, since 1983.

Legal career
Shroff has over 40 years of experience in a range of areas, including corporate and securities law, disputes, banking, bankruptcy, infrastructure, corporate governance, private client, financial regulatory and others. He has consistently been ranked as “star practitioner” in India by Chambers Global and has been called the “M&A King of India”. He was  awarded Asian Law Business (ALB) India managing partner award in 2015. 

Shroff took control of the Mumbai operations of the Amarchand Mangaldas at the age of 35 and slowly rose to being a favoured adviser to India's corporate elite.

Awards and recognitions 

 Consistently recognised as ‘Eminent Practitioners’ for Private Equity; Banking & Finance and Restructuring /Insolvency in India and ‘Star Individuals’ for Corporate M&A in India
 Ranked as ‘Market Leader’ for Energy and Infrastructure, Project Development, Banking, Project Finance, Capital Markets: Debt, M&A by IFLR1000 for several years.
 ‘Thought Leaders Global Elite’ for M&A & Governance and M&A & Project Finance, Who’s Who Legal 2022 & 2021 respectively 
 Consistently named as 'Leading Lawyer' for Corporate M&A by Legal 500 
 ‘Deal Maker of the Year’, ALB India Law Awards 2022
 Included in ‘A-List Icon’ in IBLJ A-list Lawyers 2020
 Included in Legal500's ‘Hall of Fame’ 2020 
 Recognised as IFLR Asia Best Lawyers 2020
 ‘Band 1’ Private Wealth Law, Chambers & Partners HNW Guide since published 
 ‘Commended External Counsel of the Year’, The Asian-Mena Counsel – In-House Community, 2019
 ‘Managing Partner of the Year’, ALB India Law Awards 2019 & 2022
 Recognised as ‘Elite practitioner’ for Banking and finance, Capital markets, Corporate and M&A by AsiaLaw for several years
 ‘Best Managing Partner, India’, Asian Legal Business (ALB) SE Asia Law Awards 2015

Memberships and affiliations 

 Chairman of FICCI’s Corporate Laws Committee
 Chair of the CII Financial Regulatory Committee
 Member of the Reserve Bank of India (RBI) working committee on regulatory issues relating to Fintech
 He was a member of SEBI constituted Uday Kotak Committee on Corporate Governance and SEBI Committee on Municipal Bonds Development
 Task force member of Society of Insolvency Practitioners of India
 Governing Council Member of Krea University

Background and family
Cyril Shroff is son of Suresh Amarchand Shroff, a former managing partner of Amarchand & Mangaldas & Suresh A Shroff & Co. Cyril's grandfather, Amarchand Shroff, started the law firm of "Amarchand Mangaldas" in partnership with Mangaldas Mehta in 1917. 

Cyril Shroff is married to Vandana Shroff, who is also a partner in Cyril Amarchand Mangaldas. He has two children, Rishabh Shroff, Partner & Co- Private Client and Paridhi Adani, Partner and Head - Ahmedabad at Cyril Amarchand Mangaldas. Rishabh is married to Saloni Shroff. Paridhi is married to Karan Adani, son of Gautam Adani, chairman and founder of the Adani Group.

Shroff is an avid charcoal sketcher and Hindi film buff.

References

 
 
 

20th-century Indian lawyers
Living people
Businesspeople from Mumbai
21st-century Indian lawyers
Indian lawyers
1959 births
Gujarati people
Indian corporate lawyers